The Dallas–Fort Worth Film Critics Association Award for Best Actress is an award presented by the Dallas–Fort Worth Film Critics Association. It is given in honor of an actress who has delivered an outstanding performance in a leading role.

Winners and nominees
 † = Winner of the Academy Award for Best Actress

1990s

2000s

2010s

2020s

References

External links
 Official website

Actress
Film awards for lead actress